KCSS is a non-commercial educational (NCE) radio station located on the campus of California State University, Stanislaus in Turlock, California, broadcasting on 91.9 FM.  KCSS airs an Alternative music format.

External links
Official Website

CSS
Mass media in Stanislaus County, California
Turlock, California
CSS
Radio stations established in 1975
1975 establishments in California